Dr. Bernadett Szél (born 9 March 1977) is a Hungarian economist and politician, and was a member of the National Assembly (MP) between 2012 and 2022. She was co-President of the Politics Can Be Different (Lehet Más a Politika; LMP) party from 2013 to 2018, and its candidate for the position of Prime Minister during the 2018 parliamentary election. Following internal conflicts, she resigned as co-chair in August 2018, and subsequently also left the party in October 2018.

Works
Szél was born in Pécs on 9 March 1977. She finished her secondary studies at the Zrínyi Miklós Secondary Grammar School in Zalaegerszeg. In 2000 she graduated from Corvinus University of Budapest (International Relations), where she received her Ph.D. in 2011.

Between 2000 and 2002, she worked for the Department of Corporate Affairs of Philip Morris International. After that she became program manager at the Menedék – Migránsokat Segítő Egyesület human rights organization from March to July 2002. From September 2002, she was a researcher at the Office of Supported Research Institutions of the Hungarian Academy of Sciences (MTA) for three years. She worked for the Hungarian Central Statistical Office (KSH) and also functioned as EU rapporteur since 2006.

Her research interests are family sociology, family policies and state capacity. She is a member of several research teams, and participated in domestic and international projects. She has advanced skills in English and German languages. Currently she lives in Budakeszi with her husband and two daughters.

Political career
Szél began her political career in the Humanist Party (HP); she later joined Politics Can Be Different in 2010. She was a candidate in the 2010 Hungarian parliamentary election. She ran for the mayoral seat of Budakeszi in the 2010 local election, and received 10.89% of the vote.

Szél became a Member of Parliament on 13 February 2012, replacing Virág Kaufer, who resigned on 1 February. She was elected to the Committee on Employment and Labour on 20 February. She became a member of the Committee on Youth, Social, Family, and Housing Affairs and Vice Chairperson of the Committee on Sustainable Development on 23 September 2013.

She functioned as an independent MP between February and September 2013, when the LMP parliamentary group disbanded according to the house rules, after eight members left the caucus to establish the Dialogue for Hungary (PM). Szél and András Schiffer were elected co-presidents of the LMP during the party's congress on 24 March 2013.

In September 2013, during a parliamentary debate Szél asked Zoltán Illés, the State Secretary for Environmental Affairs about the Roșia Montană Project in Romania, where, inter alia, he replied "just because you're pretty doesn't also mean you're smart," and heavily defended Prime Minister Viktor Orbán's politics from Szél's criticism. Later, Illés apologized for these remarks. House Speaker László Kövér has defended Illés' controversial comments, referring to his fellow Fidesz politician's words as "offensive, but not flagrantly offensive."

She was elected Member of Parliament from the party's national list in the 2014 parliamentary election. She became a member of the Committee on National Security 6 May 2014. After the resignation of Erzsébet Schmuck, Szél was elected leader of the LMP parliamentary group on 16 February 2017. In September 2017, Bernadett Szél was nominated the party's candidate to the position of prime minister for the upcoming parliamentary election. Viktor Orbán's Fidesz won two-thirds majority in the national election again, while LMP received 7 percent of the vote. Szél was re-elected MP via the party's national list, as she was narrowly defeated by Zsolt Csenger-Zalán in Budakeszi constituency.

LMP faced several internal conflicts in the upcoming months following the April 2018 parliamentary election. When a fellow outgoing lawmaker Róbert Benedek Sallai physically assaulted the other co-chair, Ákos Hadházy during an ethics committee meeting, Szél urged Sallai to leave the party. In response, he blamed Szél that she misused public funds to pay her hairdressing and clothing bills during the campaign. Szél denied the charges and filed a lawsuit against Sallai.

References

1977 births
Living people
Hungarian economists
Women members of the National Assembly of Hungary
LMP – Hungary's Green Party politicians
Members of the National Assembly of Hungary (2010–2014)
Members of the National Assembly of Hungary (2014–2018)
Members of the National Assembly of Hungary (2018–2022)
People from Pécs
Corvinus University of Budapest alumni
21st-century Hungarian women politicians